The Mississippi 8 Conference (M8) is a high school athletic and activities conference in the Twin Cities area in Central Minnesota with 8 member high schools. The conference derives its name from 6 of the original 8 member schools being located within 10 miles from the Mississippi River.

History
The M8 was formed in 2004 with eight charter members: Becker, Big Lake, Buffalo, Cambridge-Isanti, Monticello, Princeton, Rogers and St. Michael-Albertville (STMA), and began play in the 2005-2006 school year. Zimmerman High School was added to the conference in 2008.

Elk River High School entered the M8 as a competitor in the sport of football in 2010 and Duluth East and Duluth Denfeld High Schools joined the conference for football in the fall of 2012. St. Francis, Chisago Lakes Area, and North Branch Area High School began competing in the Mississippi 8 Conference during 2013-14 school year.

Princeton School District and Zimmerman High School voted to withdraw their participation from the Mississippi 8 in favor of a new conference, Granite Ridge Conference, for the 2011 school year. Becker School District, and Elk River High School left the conference in 2012, Becker joined the Granite Ridge Conference, and Elk River High School football rejoined the Northwest Suburban Conference. In the 2013-14 school year, Princeton rejoined the M8. In 2018 STMA and Buffalo decided to leave the conference and were placed in the Lake Conference by the MSHSL and Rogers decided to leave for the Northwest Suburban Conference beginning in the Fall of 2019. Becker High School rejoined the conference in 2019 bringing the total number of schools back to 8.

Members
The conference currently consists of 8 member schools.

Former Members

Fall Sports

Cross Country

 * No longer a member

The inaugural Cross Country Championship meet was held at Pebble Creek Golf Course in Becker. The 2006 meet was held at Liberty Elementary in Big Lake. The 2007 and 2014 meets were held at Buffalo Heights Golf Course.  In 2008 the meet was held at Grandy 9 Golf Course in Cambridge. The 2009 and 2017 meets were hosted my Monticello at Vintage Golf Course and Lake Bertram Regional Park, respectively. 2010 meet was at the Princeton Golf Course. In 2011 Rogers hosted the meet at Fox Hollow Golf Course. The 2012 conference meet was held at St. Michael Rec Center. In 2013 and 2019 the meet was held at Ponds Golf Course and was hosted by St. Francis. In 2015 the meet was held at Isanti Middle School. Ki-Chi-Soga Park in Lindstrom was home to the 2016 meet.

Football

 c = Co-champions

After the 2014 football season schools in the state of Minnesota were placed into one of 18 districts. The purpose of the changes was to reduce scheduling headaches for several schools. All of the schools in the Mississippi 8 Conference were placed into the North Central District for the 2015 season. Prior to the 2017 season STMA was reclassified to 6A, as a result the school plays in the Metro District  and North Branch was moved to the Northeast District. The other schools continue to play in the North Central District.

Soccer

 c = Co-champions
 * No longer a member

Girls Swimming and Diving

 c = Co-champions
 * No longer a member

Girls Tennis

 c = Co-champions
 * No longer a member

Volleyball

 c = Co-champions
 * No longer a member

Winter Sports

Basketball

 c = Co-champions
 * No longer a member

Dance

 c = Co-champion
 * No longer a member

Gymnastics

 c = Co-champion

Hockey 

 c = Co-champions
 * No longer a member
Becker and Big Lake are part of the Becker-Big Lake Eagles boys hockey co-op. Monticello is the host school for a boys hockey co-op with Maple Lake High School and goes by the nickname of Moose for hockey instead of the primary school nickname Magic. 

Monticello advanced to the Class A state tournament in hockey in 2017, 2018, 2020 and 2022 and made it to the Class A state title game in 2017. No other Mississippi 8 conference member has advanced further in boys hockey. Princeton has made the boys state tournament, competing three times in 2002, 2003, 2016. Chisago Lakes has also made the boys state tournament twice while North Branch and Cambridge-Isanti have both made it once.

 * No longer a member

The North Wright County co-op that includes Monticello has reached the girls state tournament twice in 2011 and 2013. The Wright County co-op consisting of all the school in the current Buffalo and North Wright County co-ops made the state tournament in 2005. Chisago Lakes has also made the girls state tournament three times, once in 2004 as part of a co-op with Pine City and in 2010 and 2012.

Boys Swimming and Diving 

 * No longer a member

Wrestling

 * No longer a member

Spring Sports

Baseball

 * No longer a member

Golf 

 * No longer a member

 * No longer a member

Softball 

 c = Co-champions
 * No longer a member

Boys Tennis 

 c = Co-champions
 * No longer a member

Track and Field 

 * No longer a member

References

External links
Minneapolis Star Tribune: Two Duluth schools placed in Mississippi 8 Conference
Monticello Times: Mississippi 8 Conference in flux as two schools split
Mississippi 8 Conference website
Star News: Elks to move into Mississippi 8
 Minneapolis Star Tribune: A closer look at: Mississippi 8 Conference
Pioneer Press: Chisago Lakes delays decision on Mississippi 8 Conference invitation

Minnesota high school sports conferences